Booster is a leading mobile energy delivery company founded in San Mateo, California. People-driven, tech-focused, and sustainability-obsessed, Booster delivers conventional and alternative fuels and energy directly to fleet vehicles, lowering carbon emissions, reducing costs, and expanding access to renewable fuels. The energy-as-a-service provider sources fuel from the terminal and delivers it directly to fleets during their non-operating hours.

Booster’s service model takes an energy-agnostic approach  to meet the needs of a diverse range of fleets, recognizing that each client’s progress in the energy transition looks different. The company provides a variety of fuels including traditional gas and diesel, renewable diesel and other sustainable fuels.

Booster currently offers services in hundreds of areas coast-to-coast through a robust distributed energy delivery service network. Using proprietary technology and integrated logistics, the company has reinvented the way fleets are fueled, helping companies save an average of $1600 and 587 lbs of CO2 annually per vehicle. In 2022, Booster was recognized as one of Inc.’s Best in Business in Logistics and Transportation.

History 
Booster was founded in 2015 by Frank Mycroft, Diego Netto, and Tyler Raugh. The company's first product was an app-based on-demand fueling service for personal vehicles in corporate campus parking lots.

Within its first few years of business, Booster began to offer its fueling services to enterprise fleets. When the COVID-19 pandemic hit and personal vehicles no longer congregated in corporate parking lots, the company pivoted to servicing fleet vehicles during their non-operating hours. Between early 2020 and early 2021, the company doubled its fleet customer base as demand for last-mile delivery services spiked during the COVID-19 pandemic.

In November 2021, Booster announced a partnership with Renewable Energy Group, a leading producer and supplier of biofuels. This was the company's first formal announcement of a renewable energy offering. By September 2022, the company had transitioned nearly all of its California-based fleets to renewable diesel, which offers up to 70% lower lifecycle GHG emissions compared to its petroleum counterpart.

Since its inception, Booster has seen steady growth across enterprise fleets, small- and medium business fleets, and last-mile delivery fleets.

Business
Booster meets fleets where they are, not just geographically, but also in their sustainability journey. The mobile fueler takes an energy agnostic approach, allowing Booster to adapt to each client’s unique energy transition journey with its range of conventional and sustainable alternative solutions. Booster provides a range of fuels, including gasoline, diesel, renewable diesel, diesel exhaust fluid, biodiesel, synthetic blends and ethanol blends. The company has also piloted a mobile electric charging program that would provide an alternative to the cost and grid capacity barriers associated with fixed charging infrastructure.

A technology-driven company, Booster’s service is enabled by the newest technologies in trucking, routing, and energy delivery. Its purple Smart Tankers are equipped with the latest technology and built-in safety features including IoT enablement, proprietary routing AI, and collision and overturn spill protection.

In addition to fueling services, the company offers a significant data dashboard service, which uses data collected during fuel deliveries to provide detailed insights to fleet owners and operators. Metrics include fuel consumption, spend, estimated cost savings, carbon emissions, and gallons pumped.

Booster has serviced clients including Amazon, Ferguson Enterprises, Zum, UPS and Imperfect Foods.

Funding 
Booster Fuels received $3.1 million in a 2015 funding round which included Madrona Venture Group, Planetary Resources co-founder Eric Anderson and other angel investors. By 2016 the company raised $9 million Series A funding round from the likes of Maveron, Madrona Venture Group, Version One Ventures and RRE Ventures. The company’s Series B funding round, conducted by Conversion Capital in August 2017, raised $20 million, bringing Booster’s total capital raised at that time to $32 million. 

In 2019, Booster completed its Series C funding, raising an additional $56 million. The company’s Series D funding round was led by Rose Park Advisors in 2022, garnering more than $125 million with participation from new investors Chaac Ventures, Equinor Ventures, Mitsubishi Corporation, Thayer Ventures and Renewable Energy Group.

Policy and Advocacy Work 
From inception, Booster’s identity has been rooted in its ability to succeed in a harsh regulatory environment. As a result, the startup focused efforts on policy development to drive state and local regulation change, expanding opportunities for mobile fueling and supporting the communities Booster serves.

Booster is the only on-demand mobile fueling company holding an Executive Order from the California Air Resources Board (CARB). The Executive Order validates Booster’s mobile fueling on-demand (MFOD) delivery vehicle gasoline dispensing system for on-board refueling vapor recovery (ORVR) vehicles. It found that Booster’s MFOD tank vehicle conforms to all requirements set forth in CP-205, including compatibility when fueling vehicles equipped with ORVR systems and compliance with applicable performance standards or specifications listed in applicable CARB Certification Procedures.

Booster’s policy team also advocated to pass bill HB 2873 in Washington state, streamlining the permitting process for mobile fueling within fire districts. The purpose of the bill, now signed into law, established a reciprocity system for fire permitting state-wide and streamlined the qualification and processes required for a permit. 

Booster is a part of Coalition for Accessible Transportation, a disability-lead, grassroots coalition whose purpose is to educate on and advocate for mobile fueling. The Coalition includes Booster, United Spinal Association, Muscular Dystrophy Association, and Northern California Spinal Cord Injury Foundation. The Coalition also connects advocates with their local representatives to advocate for mobile-fueling-positive regulations.

ESG and Sustainability 
Booster abides by a robust set of environmental, social and governance frameworks, which are each aligned with the United Nations Sustainable Development Goals. In 2022, Booster released its inaugural ESG report, which details its sustainability commitments and strategies.

Booster’s environmental policies begin with safety considerations. Company Service Professionals follow strict protocol to minimize risk of spillage and hazardous accidents. This includes the requirement of a CDL Class C permit with hazmat and tanker endorsements; adherence to the highest safety requirements set by the International Fire Code, the U.S. Department of Transportation, the Environmental Protection Agency, and more. The company has also created a three-stage spill prevention protocol with a zero-drip policy to ensure minimal spillage when vehicles are fueled. 

Other environmental sustainability actions taken by Booster  include participation in the California Clean Air Day Pledge, the transition of all the company’s diesel-fueled California-based fleets to renewable diesel (which offers up to 70% fewer lifecycle emissions than its petroleum counterpart), and the low-carbon status of Booster’s fleet of renewable-diesel-powered Smart Tankers.

Booster’s social action commitments include safety as well. The company focuses heavily on diversity, equity, inclusion and belonging (DEI&B), and was named a 2022 "Top Company for Women to Work for in Transportation" by the Women in Trucking Association.  The startup also strengthens communities by providing emergency services in times of crisis, including supporting emergency response during and after hurricanes, tornadoes, blackouts and wildfires.

Booster’s governance commitments center around the company’s six core values: safety, customer, integrity,  excellence, bold, and stewardship. The  company’s corporate governance, ethics, and conflict of interest guidelines include strict policies to protect against discrimination, an open door policy that encourages honest and direct communication, and a detailed whistleblower process that provides an anonymous reporting method for suspected violations.

References

External links
 Official website

American companies established in 2015